Naughty America is a pornographic film studio based in San Diego, California

History

The company was founded in June 2001 with a small staff under the brand name SoCal Cash and changed its name to Naughty America in March 2004. The date 1776 in its logo refers to the United States Declaration of Independence in which Thomas Jefferson declared the right of “Life, liberty, and the pursuit of happiness.”

In 2008, the company employed over 60 staff members and has released over 70 DVDs. These DVDs are distributed worldwide by Pureplay Media since November 2005. In addition to the DVDs, they also have over 6,900 movies on their site.

The company launched a gay line called Suite 703 in January 2008.

In October 2008, Naughty America launched an Adobe Air-based application called Naughty America Direct, which was described as "basically an iTunes for porn". It sold individual full-length DRM-free scenes with no subscription. It was shut down shortly thereafter due to the departure of the developer in charge.

Awards
Naughty America have been nominated for AVN awards on many occasions. In 2008 Naughty America/Pure Play Media won the AVN Best Ethnic-Themed Series (Asian) award for the Asian 1 on 1 series. They also won the 2011 AVN Best Ethnic-Themed Series (Latin) award for the Latin Adultery series.

In 2012 they won the XBIZ Awards for Latin-Themed Series of the Year for 'Latin Adultery' and Studio Site of the Year for NaughtyAmerica.com.

In 2013 they received multiple XBIZ Award nominations including 'Studio of the Year' and 'Vignette Series of the Year' for My Sister's Hot Friend Vol. 25 and Tonight's Girlfriend Vol. 7. Additional nominations include 'Vignette Series of the Year' for My Wife's Hot Friend. They won numerous XBIZ Awards for 'Vignette Series of the Year' and 'New Series of the Year' for Tonight's Girlfriend, 'Latin-Themed Series of the Year' for Latin Adultery, and 'Studio Site of the Year'.

In 2014 they received the XBIZ Award in the category of 'Vignette Series of the Year' for "Tonight's Girlfriend."

References

External links

American erotica and pornography websites
American pornographic film studios
Companies based in San Diego
Internet properties established in 2000
Pornography in California